Haut-Nyong is a department of East Province in Cameroon. The department covers an area of 36,384 km and as of 2001 had a total population of 216,768. The capital of the department lies at Abong-Mbang.

Subdivisions
The department is divided administratively into 14 communes and in turn into villages.

Communes 
 Abong-Mbang
 Angossas
 Atok
 Dimako
 Doumaintang
 Doumé
 Lomié
 Mboma
 Messamena
 Messok
 Mindourou
 Ngoyla
 Nguelemendouka
 Somalomo

References

Departments of Cameroon
East Region (Cameroon)